"I'll Keep You Satisfied" is a song written primarily by Paul McCartney and credited to the Lennon-McCartney partnership. 
It was released as a single by Billy J. Kramer with the Dakotas on 1 November 1963, and released on Kramer's album Little Children. It reached number 4 and spent 13 weeks in the UK charts, kept off the top spot by the Beatles' "She Loves You" (another Lennon–McCartney composition) and "You'll Never Walk Alone". The song hit #30 in the 1964 US charts.

Recording 
The song was recorded on 14 October 1963 at Abbey Road Studios.  Lennon was present at the recording.

Notes 

1963 songs
Billy J. Kramer songs
Songs written by Lennon–McCartney
Song recordings produced by George Martin